The 1974 Cal State Hayward Pioneers football team represented California State University, Hayward—now known as California State University, East Bay—as a member of the Far Western Conference (FWC) during the 1974 NCAA Division II football season. Led by Bob Rodrigo in his fourth and final season as head coach, Cal State Hayward compiled an overall record of 3–6 with a mark of 2–3 in conference play, placing in a five-way tie for second in the FWC. The team was outscored by its opponents 223 to 147 for the season. The Pioneers played home games at Pioneer Stadium in Hayward, California.

Rodrigo resigned as head coach in early 1975 and was succeeded by Tim Tierney, who had served the team's defensive coordinator for five seasons.

Schedule

References

Cal State Hayward
Cal State Hayward Pioneers football seasons
Cal State Hayward Pioneers football